Alfred Ely Beach (September 1, 1826 – January 1, 1896) was an American inventor, publisher, and patent lawyer, born in Springfield, Massachusetts. He is most known for his design of New York City's earliest subway predecessor, the Beach Pneumatic Transit. A member of the Union League of New York, he also patented a typewriter for the blind and a system for heating water with solar power.

Early years
Beach was born in Springfield, Massachusetts, and was the son of a prominent publisher, Moses Yale Beach. Alfred Beach worked for his father until he and a friend, Orson Desaix Munn, decided to buy Scientific American, a relatively new publication, becoming the early founders of that company. He also brought in the venture Salem Howe Wales, President of the New York City Department of Docks and co-founder of the Metropolitan Museum of Art. They ran Scientific American until their deaths decades later, and it was carried on by their sons and grandsons for decades more. 

Scientific American is now the oldest continuously published magazine in the United States, and has featured prominent scientists over time such as Albert Einstein, Nikola Tesla, Marie Curie, and Thomas Edison. They reported the invention and patent of Abraham Lincoln relating to his device that intended to help boats navigate shallows.

Munn and Beach also established a very successful patent agency.  Beach patented some of his own inventions, notably an early typewriter designed for use by the blind and an engineering first for the Americas, designed and built one of the world's first tunnelling shields in the same year as famed engineer James Henry Greathead.

After the Civil War he founded a school for freed slaves in  Savannah, Georgia, the Beach Institute, which is now the home of the King-Tisdell Cottage Foundation. It was the first school in Savannah erected specifically for the education of African Americans, and was built by Freedmen’s Bureau, at the initiation of President Lincoln, and was managed by the American Missionary Association. Alumni include Mayor Otis Johnson and Senator Regina Thomas.

Invention of a subway

Beach's most famous invention was New York City's first subway, the Beach Pneumatic Transit. He created his own enterprise using the technology, naming it the Beach Pneumatic Transit Company, and made himself its President. This idea came about during the late 1860s, when traffic in New York was a nightmare, especially along its central artery of Broadway. Beach was one of a few visionaries who proposed building an underground railway under Broadway to help relieve the traffic congestion. The inspiration was the underground Metropolitan Railway in London but in contrast to that and others' proposals for New York, Beach proposed the use of trains propelled by pneumatics instead of conventional steam engines, and construction using a tunnelling shield of his invention to minimize disturbing the street.

Beach used a circular design based upon Marc Isambard Brunel's rectangular shield, which may represent the shift in design from rectangular to cylindrical.  It was unclear when or who transitioned tunneling shield design from rectangular to circular until The New York Times wrote an article describing the original Beach tunneling shield in 1870.

Beach was also interested in pneumatic tubes for the transport of letters and packages, another idea recently put into use in London. He refused to blackmail "Boss" Tweed to have his proposal approved. He set out a way to bypass the politician by building in secret his tunnel. He put up $350,000 of his own money to bankroll the project, allowing him to bypass the corruption and extortion schemes of Tammany Hall. His thinking was that once the public will see the completed subway, the politicians would not dare to stop him. With a franchise from the state he began construction of a tunnel for small pneumatic tubes in 1869, but diverted it into a demonstration of a passenger railway that opened on February 26, 1870. To build a passenger railway he needed a different franchise, something he lobbied for over four legislative sessions, 1870 to 1873.  Construction of the tunnel was obvious from materials being delivered to Warren Street near Broadway, and was documented in newspaper reports, but Beach kept all details secret until the New York Tribune published a possibly planted article a few weeks before opening.

In 1870 New York state senator William M. Tweed introduced a bill to fund construction of Beach's subway which did not pass.  By the end of 1871 Tweed's Tammany Hall political machine was in disgrace and from then on Beach, in an effort to gain support from reformers, claimed that Tweed had opposed his subway. The real opposition to the subway was from politically connected property owners along Broadway, led by Alexander Turney Stewart and John Jacob Astor III, who feared that tunnelling would damage buildings and interfere with surface traffic.  Bills for Beach's subway passed the legislature in 1871 and 1872 but were vetoed by Governor John T. Hoffman because he said that they gave away too much authority without compensation to the city or state.  In 1873 Governor John Adams Dix signed a similar bill into law, but Beach was not able to raise funds to build over the next six months, and then the Panic of 1873 dried up the financial markets.

During this same time, other investors had built an elevated railway at Greenwich Street and Ninth Avenue, which operated successfully with a small steam engine starting in 1870.  This elevated railway gave an Idea to James Henry Greathead for the Docker's Umbrella in Liverpool which, was a similar idea for an overhead railway for the purpose of easing congestion on the ground in England. The wealthy property owners did not object to the New York City railway well away from Broadway, and by the mid-1870s it appeared that elevated railways were practical and underground railways were not, setting the pattern for rapid transit development in New York City for the remainder of the 19th century.

Beach operated his demonstration railway from February 1870 to April 1873.  It had one station in the basement of Devlin's clothing store, a building at the southwest corner of Broadway and Warren Street, and ran for a total of about 300 feet, first around a curve to the center of Broadway and then straight under the center of Broadway to the south side of Murray Street.  The former Devlin's building was destroyed by fire in 1898.  In 1912 workers for Degnon Contracting excavated the tunnel proper during the construction of a subway line running under Broadway.  The tunnel was completely within the limits of the present day City Hall station under Broadway.  The British pneumatic tube also failed to attract much attention and eventually fell into disrepair and disrepute in spite of the fact that Royal Mail had contracted to use the tunnels. Ultimately the English experiment failed due to technical issues as well as lack of funds.

Much of the Beach subway story was recalled as precedent by Lawrence Edwards in his lead article of the August 1965 issue of Scientific American, which described his invention of Gravity-Vacuum Transit.

The Beach Tunnelling shield, similar to the 1864 English patent idea of Barlow's, was used in the construction of the Grand Trunk Railway, headquartered in Montreal, Canada's first St. Clair Tunnel between Port Huron, Michigan and Sarnia, Ontario. This tunnel opened in 1890.

In January 1887, Beach allowed his son and six other men to start a yacht club on his property in Stratford, Connecticut. The Housatonic boat club is the oldest operating Yacht club in Connecticut. The club purchased the land from the Beach estate in 1954.

Death
Beach died of pneumonia on January 1, 1896, in New York City at the age of 69.

He had a son named Frederick Converse Beach, who invented a photolithographic process and ran Scientific American Magazine, and a grandson named Stanley Yale Beach, who worked for Scientific American as well but also became an aviation pioneer, and an early financier of Gustave Whitehead, the contested first maker of a powered controlled flight before the Wright brothers.

Both were Yale graduates, having graduated from the Sheffield Scientific School.

References

External links

 Alfred Beach's Pneumatic Subway and the beginnings of rapid transit in New York by Joseph Brennan
 Alfred Ely Beach – Beach's Bizarre Broadway Subway Klaatu's detailed background article, explaining the technical and political details of the project.
 NEW YORK’S SECRET SUBWAY – American Heritage
 "Pneumatic Transit" Animation by Abby Digital

1826 births
1896 deaths
19th-century American inventors
Beach family
Businesspeople from Springfield, Massachusetts
American patent attorneys
American magazine publishers (people)
19th-century American newspaper publishers (people)
Scientific American people
American railroad pioneers
19th-century American journalists
American male journalists